Artur Jan Orzechowski is a Polish diplomat serving as an ambassador to Belgium from 2016 to 2021.

Life 
Artur Orzechowski has graduated from Romance studies at the Maria Curie-Skłodowska University, Lublin, Poland and the National School of Public Administration.

In 1994, Orzechowski joined the Ministry of Foreign Affairs of Poland. He was holding directoral posts of the Department of the Americas (2008–2009) and the European Policy Department (2013–2016). He has been working at the consulate in Montreal, embassy in Washington, D.C. (head of political section, 2005–2007) and at Permanent Representation to Nato and Western European Union in Brussels (deputy head of mission, 2007–2008). On 24 August 2016 he was nominated Poland ambassador to Belgium. He presented his credentials on 30 August 2016. He ended his term on 30 April 2021.

Besides Polish, he speaks English, French, Spanish, Italian and Portuguese languages.

References 

20th-century births
Ambassadors of Poland to Belgium
Living people
Maria Curie-Skłodowska University alumni
National School of Public Administration (Poland) alumni
Year of birth missing (living people)